Sprowston Manor Hotel is a AA 4 star hotel, part of which is the 19th-century Sprowston Hall. It is located on the north east suburbs, of the English city of Norwich, close to the suburb of Sprowston and village of Rackheath, within the county of Norfolk, United Kingdom.

Location
The hotel is situated within 170 aces of parkland.

History 

Sprowston Hall was purchased by John Corbet II formerly belonging to the Bishop of Norwich, for £176 in 1540. On the death of John Corbet II in 1559 the manor of Sprowston was left to his wife Jane. It was sold to Sir Thomas Adams, who was Lord Mayor of London in 1645. In the 18th century the manor was acquired by Sir Lambert Blackwell, a governor of the South Sea Company, who was created a baronet in 1718. In the 19th century the manor went through a number of families until it came into the hands of the Gurney family and John Gurney, who was mayor of Norwich and blind, rebuilt the hall between 1872 and 1876. The hall is constructed in three storeys of red brick.

During the Second World War the hall was commandeered by the military for use by the GOC Eastern Command.

Hotel 
The manor house underwent major redevelopment in 1973, when it was converted to a Marriott hotel. The hotel has a total of 94 en- suite rooms of which 19 are suites. Part of the hotels 170 acre parkland is an 18-hole championship golf course. There is also an indoor swimming pool and spa. The hotel has 12 meeting rooms and frequently hosts conferences, banquets, exhibitions and is used as a wedding venue. Sprowston Manor is also home to the 1559 Restaurant which is located in the oldest part of the building, and also Cafe, Bar and Grill. The hotel was originally operated by Marriott Hotels & Resorts until March 2018 when it was taken over by Britannia Hotels. This was along with 5 other Marriott hotels across the UK. The hotel is approached along an oak lined driveway. Features of the original manor house include high ceilings and oak paneling to some of the rooms.

Championship golf course 
The golf course at Sprowston Manor replaced the hotel's original layout in 2003, incorporating an additional 20 hectares to produce a course measuring 6500 yards, with a par of 71 and including 70 bunkers.

References 

Golf clubs and courses in Norfolk
Hotel spas
Hotels in Norfolk
Country houses in Norfolk
Hotels established in 1973
Sports venues in Norfolk
Country house hotels